Peter Mak is a Hong Kong film director and actor. The films he has directed include The Wicked City, All Night Long, and Enemy Shadow. As an actor he has appeared in Shu zhi suo zhi , Happy Sixteen, Lai Shi, China's Last Eunuch, Tiger Cage  and Twin Dragons.

Background
Peter Mak  aka Tai-kit was born in Saigon, Vietnam  in 1957. When he was a boy he regularly went to the cinema. During the Vietnam war his family moved to Hong Kong.

Actor
He had a main role in David Lai's Lonely Fifteen which was released in 1982. The film also starred Becky Lam, Irene Wan, So Pui-fong, Leung Mei-king The following year, he had a role in Shu zhi suo zhi which was directed by Kin-Kwok Lai.   In 1987, he had a part in Jacob Cheung's Lai Shi, China's Last Eunuch.

He appeared in Twin Dragons which was directed by Ringo Lam and Hark Tsui.

Director

1980s
He both directed and acted in the 1986 horror film, Loves of the Living Dead aka Heaven Wife, Hell Wife which was released in 1986. The supernatural comedy also starred Mark Cheng , Ann Bridgewater  and   Charine Chan . He directed Sir, Tell Me Why which was released the following year. The film is about a teacher who has to deal with problem students and overcome the problems and difficulties associated with them. The film starred Siu Hung-Mui, Chang Shih, Tou Chung-hua, Tou Chung-kang, and Yang Chieh-mei.

1990s to present
He directed The Wicked City which was released in 1992. The Kong horror/fantasy was based on an animated film by Yoshiaki Kawajiri. Staying close to the original story line, it was about special agents fighting demons from a parallel dimension. It starred Jacky Cheung, Leon Lai and Tatsuya Nakadai.

He directed Enemy Shadow which was released in 1995. The film which starred Jade Leung was a tale about a rookie cop who witnessed her boyfriend murdered by bank robbers. She suffers from guilt as a result of not doing anything when the tragedy took place.

Filmography

References

External links
 HK Cinemagic: Peter Mak
 Imdb: Peter Mak

Living people
Hong Kong screenwriters
Hong Kong film producers
Hong Kong male film actors
Hong Kong film directors
20th-century Hong Kong male actors
Hong Kong artists
Year of birth missing (living people)
People from Ho Chi Minh City